Insolera is a surname. Notable people with the surname include:

Carola Insolera (born 1995), Norwegian model
Emilio Insolera (born 1979), Italian actor and producer
Humberto Insolera (born 1975), deaf Italian politician, academic, and advocate
Italo Insolera (1929–2012), Italian architect, urban and land planner, and historian